The Chilcotin War, the Chilcotin Uprising or the Bute Inlet Massacre was a confrontation in 1864 between members of the Tsilhqot'in (Chilcotin) people in British Columbia and white road construction workers. Fourteen men employed by Alfred Waddington in the building of a road from Bute Inlet were killed, as well as a number of men with a pack-train near Anahim Lake and a settler at Puntzi Lake.

Background
In 1862, Alfred Waddington began lobbying the press and his political allies for support to build a wagon road from Bute Inlet to Fort Alexandria, where it would connect to the Cariboo Road and continue on to the goldfields at Barkerville. He received approval for the construction early in 1863. The Bute Inlet Wagon Road was to follow the Homathko River valley from its mouth at the head of Bute Inlet, then swing northeast across the Chilcotin Plateau to join the Bentinck Arm Trail at Puntzi Lake and the mouth of the Quesnel River. It was also one of the routes considered and advocated by Waddington for the transcontinental railway, which was eventually constructed to what became Vancouver instead.

The Tŝilhqot'in, along with many other First Nations of the Pacific Northwest, had just been devastated by the 1862 Pacific Northwest smallpox epidemic. Some colonists saw the epidemic as an opportunity to take over First Nation lands. Many indigenous peoples, including the Tŝilhqot'in, believed that the epidemic had been deliberately spread among native peoples for the purpose of stealing their land, a claim that has largely been corroborated through the historical written record.

Outbreak of violence 
The violence began when construction crews on Waddington's Road entered the territory of the Tsilhqot'in nation without permission, after members of the First Nation had been working on road construction and going without compensation, being lied to time and time again, near starvation. Construction had been underway for two years when, on April 29, 1864, a ferryman named Timothy Smith, stationed 30 miles up the river, was killed after refusing a demand from Chief Klattasine (Lhatŝ'aŝʔin: ″Nobody Knows Him″, ″We Do Not Know His Name″), Tellot and other Tsilhqot'in for food. Smith was shot and his body thrown into the river. His food stores and supplies were looted. A half ton of provisions were taken. A skiff was chopped to pieces and the ferry scow set adrift, leaving only the cable over the river. The following day the Tsilhqot'in attacked the workers' camp at daylight. Three men, Peter A. Petersen, Edward Moseley and Philip Buckley, though injured (Moseley was unharmed), escaped and fled down the river. The remaining crew were killed and their bodies thrown into the river.

Four miles further up the trail, the band came upon the foreman, William Brewster, and three of his men blazing trail. All were killed. The band also killed William Manning, a settler at Puntzi Lake.

A pack train led by Alexander McDonald, though warned, continued into the area and three of the drivers were killed in the ensuing ambush. In all, nineteen men were killed.

In New Westminster, Governor Seymour, just a month into his term, received news of the attacks on May 14. The next day Chartres Brew and 28 men were sent to Bute Inlet aboard HMS Forward, but they were unable to make their way up the trail from the Homathko valley to the scene of the incident, and returned to New Westminster. A second party of 50 men under Gold Commissioner William Cox went to the area using an overland route, met an ambush and retreated. Brew, aboard HMS Sutlej, along with the Governor and 38 men, went out again to reach the Chilcoltin from Bentinck Arm. They arrived July 7 and met Cox. Donald McLean led a scouting party to reconnoitre. A guide, hearing a rifle click, urged him to get down. He didn't and was shot through the heart.

Arrest and execution of Tsilhqot'in chiefs
In 1864, Chief Alexis and a slave of Klattasine met with Cox and were given assurances of friendship by Cox. Tsilhqot'in chiefs believed that they were going to attend peace talks. The next day Klattasine, Tellot and six others arrived. They were arrested. Although denied by Cox, they claimed to have been offered immunity. The prisoners were returned to Alexandria. Five of the Tsilhqot'in men (Tellot, Klattasine, Tah-pitt, Piele, and Chessus) were arrested and charged with murder. They were tried in September 1864 at Quesnel at a trial by jury overseen by Judge Begbie. In defence of their actions, Klattasine said they were waging war, not committing murder. The five were found guilty and sentenced to hang. The day they were executed is now a day of mourning in the Tsilhqot'in Nation. The sixth chief, Chief ʔAhan was executed a year later, on July 18th, in New Westminster.

The incident cost the colony about $80,000. A petition to the Imperial parliament to share this cost was declined. Donald McLean's widow was given a pension of £100 per year for five years. Waddington sought compensation of $50,000 from the colony, saying that his party had been given no protection. The colony declined, saying that none was requested, and no state could guarantee its citizens safety from murder.

Waddington was of the view that fears of the introduction of smallpox was the cause of the unrest. Frederick Whymper, an artist attached to Waddington's crew, attributed the unrest to the provision of firearms to the Chilcotin at a time when they were suffering from lack of food. Judge Begbie concluded that the most important cause of the unrest was concern over title to land rather than "plunder or revenge". Others say that the native packers in Brewster's crew were starving while the white members of the crew were well supplied. There were also grievances about desecration of graves and interference with valuable spring waters.

Review of trial
The arrest, trial, and execution of the six Tsilhqot'in chiefs as criminals was challenged by the Tsilhqot'in nation on the basis that the violence was a war between two sovereign nations. The Tŝilhqot’in were acting to protect their lands, people, and way of life from the onslaught of road builders at the time. in 2018, Prime Minister Trudeau stated that the War Chiefs were regarded as heroes to their people. 

In 1993 Judge Anthony Sarich wrote a report commissioned by the government of British Columbia, on an inquiry into the relationship between the Aboriginal community in British Columbia and the justice system. As a result of the recommendations in the report, the Attorney General apologized for the hanging of the Chilcotin chiefs and provided funding for an archaeological investigation to locate their graves. The British Columbia government also installed a commemorative plaque at the site of the hanging of the Tsilhqot'in chiefs.

In 2014, the British Columbia government exonerated the Chilcotin leaders. Premier Christy Clark stated, "We confirm without reservation that these six Tsilhqot'in chiefs are fully exonerated for any crime or wrongdoing." This exoneration was reciprocally made by Prime Minister Justin Trudeau, on behalf of the Government of Canada, on March 26, 2018, in a speech to Parliament. During the exoneration speech, the then current Chiefs of the Tŝilhqot’in Nation were invited onto the floor of the House of Commons and provided a drum song. This was the first time in Canadian history that an Indigenous Nation was invited onto the floor of the House of Commons. Clark also acknowledged that "there is an indication [that smallpox] was spread intentionally."

On November 2, 2018, Trudeau fulfilled a promise made in his apology speech in March and became the first prime minister to visit the land of the Tsilhqot'in people, where he made another apology speech, this time to the Tsilhqot'in community and its leaders. Trudeau rode into the valley on a black horse, symbolizing the ones ridden by the wrongfully executed chiefs and participated in a smudging ceremony during his time there.

In media

Donna Milner uses the Chilcotin War in historical fiction book: A Place Called Sorry.

See also
List of massacres in Canada

Bibliography
Notes

References

 - Total pages: 264 
 
 - Total pages: 558 

 - Total pages: 408 
Rothenburger, Mel The Chilcotin War, 1978

Further reading
 High Slack: Waddington's Gold Road and the Bute Inlet Massacre of 1864 Judith Williams  
 Historical fiction:  - Total pages: 264
 Swanky, Tom. 2012. The True Story of Canada's "War" Of Extermination On the Pacific: plus The Tsilhqot'in and other First Nations Resistance. British Columbia: Dragon Heart.

Conflicts in 1864
First Nations history in British Columbia
Wars involving the indigenous peoples of North America
Indigenous conflicts in Canada
Tsilhqot'in
Chilcotin Country
People executed by Canada by hanging
Massacres by First Nations
1864 in case law
British colonization of the Americas
Events in the British Empire
Battles involving the British Empire
1860s in British Columbia
Pre-Confederation British Columbia